Old Main is an academic building on the campus of Wayne State University. It is located at 4841 Cass Avenue in Midtown Detroit, Michigan, on Wayne's main campus.

Location

Old Main is located on the southwest corner of the intersection of Cass and Warren Ave. in the busy Midtown area of Detroit. Old Main is situated at the southern end of the main campus of Wayne State University, across Warren from the Science Building and just north of the college's Hilberry Theater. It stands approximately 1.5 miles north of downtown Detroit, one block west of the city's main street, Woodward Avenue, and within less than a mile of three of Detroit's major freeways, the Chrysler (I-75), the Lodge (M-10), and the Ford (I-94).

History
The building now known as Old Main was originally built as Detroit's Central High School. Construction of the building began on December 13, 1894. It was built over a three-year period out of brick and limestone quarried from the land directly in front of it. The structure was designed by architects Malcomson & Higginbotham and contained 103 classrooms, laboratories, offices, and space for 2,000 students. The building cost $573,345.13, most of which was paid for by state appropriations and an emergency building fund campaign.

Central High School moved to this new location from its previous home in the former Michigan State Capitol building in downtown Detroit's Capitol Park, which had burned down in 1893. Central High began classes here in 1896 as the building neared completion. As the number of students grew, a large wing was added to the rear of the building in 1908. In 1913 the high school began offering some college-level courses, and in 1917 the new two-year Detroit Junior College began to operate in the building. In 1923 this would become the four-year degree granting College of the City of Detroit, one of the main precursor institutions of today's Wayne State University.

By 1926 the building had become overcrowded and Central High School was moved to its present location at 2425 Tuxedo St. The building was then given over entirely to the college and was renamed as the Main Building. As the college has grown around it and evolved, first to Wayne University in 1934, and then to Wayne State University in 1956, the building came to be affectionately known as "Old Main".

As time has passed, many modifications and repairs have been made to the aging structure. During the 1930s and 1940s, new walls, rooms, and other changes were made inside the building. The clock in the tower was replaced in 1934, along with the rest of the building's clocks that were linked to it. The building was enlarged with a new wing along the Warren Ave. side in 1937. By the 1980s though, falling ceilings, peeling paint, vandalism, a fire, plumbing failures, leaking roofs, and deferred maintenance had taken their toll on Old Main. To remedy the situation Wayne State University launched a fund raising campaign in 1995, and later sought state assistance. As a result, large-scale renovations of the structure were begun that year. Electrical and mechanical systems were replaced, and much of the building restored to its original look.

Today, the renovated Old Main serves as the home of the College of Liberal Arts and Sciences of Wayne State University as well as accommodating many other classes in a wide variety of subjects. Old Main now reflects the University's history, growth and development, and is widely seen as the symbol of Wayne State University.

Departments 

 Planetarium  (Basement)

 Department of Geology (Basement)
 Office of the Department of Geology
 Mineralogy/Petrology Lab
 Audio Tutorial Lab (Geology 1010 Lab)
 Structural/Geomorphology Lab
 Mineral Collections

 Museum of Anthropology (1st floor)
 Map Room
 Library
 Museum office
 Archaeology Laboratory

 Department of Music (1st floor)
 Schaver Music Recital hall
 Recording Studio

 College of Liberal Arts and Sciences (2nd Floor) 

 College of Fine Performing and Communication Arts (2nd Floor) 
 Maggie Allesee Department of Dance
 Department of Art and Art History (Partial)

 College of Fine Performing and Communication Arts Fashion and Design (2nd Floor) 
 Textile Lab
 Clothing Design
 Dorothea June Grossbart Historic Costume Collection

 Department of Art and Art History (2nd Floor) 
 Interior Design
 Interiors Library
 Interior Studio
 Interior Lighting Lab
 Fibers
 Fiber Dye Lab
 Weaving Studio
 Fiber Studio

 Department of Music (2nd Floor)
 Music Technology Lab
 Piano Lab
 Prof. Poole Memorial Orchestral Library
 Large Ensemble Rehearsal Room
 Jazz Rehearsal Room

 Department of Art and Art History (3rd Floor) 
 Painting
 Drawing
 Graphic Design
 Interdisciplinary Electronic Arts

 Department of Theatre (3rd Floor)
 Computer Labs
 Two Theatre Movement Studios
 Design Studios

 Department of Dance (3rd Floor) 
 Dance Studios

 Music Department Practice Rooms  (4th Floor)

 Department of Film and Media Arts & Studies (4th Floor)
 Editing Suites
 TV Studio & Control Room

 Department of Photography (4th Floor)
 Photography Computer Lab
 Photography Studios
 Photography Dark Room
 Photography Lab

See also
Wayne State University Buildings

Further reading

External links
Reuther Library, "Partners in Education, Old Main and Wayne"

Wayne State University
National Register of Historic Places in Detroit
Historic district contributing properties in Michigan
University and college academic buildings in the United States
Towers in Michigan
Clock towers in Michigan
Culture of Detroit
1895 establishments in Michigan